The following is a list of evolutionary psychologists or prominent contributors to the field of evolutionary psychology.


A
Richard D. Alexander

B
Jerome Barkow
Justin L. Barrett
Paul Bloom
Pascal Boyer
David F. Bjorklund
David Buller
David Buss

C
Anne Campbell
Leda Cosmides

D
Martin Daly
Charles Darwin
Robin Dunbar

E
 Irenäus Eibl-Eibesfeldt

F
Daniel Fessler
W. Tecumseh Fitch
Diana Fleischman

G
David C. Geary

H
Jonathan Haidt
William D. Hamilton
Judith Rich Harris
Nicholas Humphrey
Sarah Blaffer Hrdy

J
Benedict Jones
Victor Johnston

K
Satoshi Kanazawa
Douglas T. Kenrick
Robert Kurzban

L
Elisabeth Lloyd

M
Richard Machalek
Francis T. McAndrew
Geoffrey Miller
Desmond Morris

N
Randolph M. Nesse
Steven Neuberg
Daniel Nettle

P
David Perrett
Steven Pinker

R
Matt Ridley

S
Gad Saad
Mark Schaller
David P. Schmitt
Nancy Segal
Todd K. Shackelford
John Skoyles
Dan Sperber
Donald Symons

T
John Tooby
Robert Trivers

V
Mark van Vugt

W
George C. Williams
David Sloan Wilson
Glenn Wilson
Margo Wilson
Lance Workman
Robert Wright

References

 
Evolutionary psychologists
Cognitive science lists